Mary Lazich (born October 3, 1952) is an American Republican politician.  She served five years in the Wisconsin State Assembly and 19 years in the State Senate, and was President of the Senate for her final session (2015–2016).

Early life
Born in Loyal, Wisconsin, she graduated from Loyal High School and went on to earn her bachelor's degree from the University of Wisconsin–Milwaukee, graduating summa cum laude. She was a New Berlin city councilmember from 1986 through 1992, and a Waukesha County supervisor from 1990 through 1993.

Legislative career

In the Senate, Lazich represented the 28th District since winning a special election in April 1998. She was elected as president of the Wisconsin Senate in January 2015, the first female ever elected to that position.  She was previously a member of the Wisconsin Assembly from 1992 through 1998.

In 2004, Lazich was criticized for lying about her vote for Senate Majority Leader.

On March 21, 2016, Lazich announced that she would not run for re-election in 2016.

2011 recall attempt
Senator Lazich was one of several Wisconsin state senators who faced a recall campaign in 2011 and 2012 due to her support for Governor Scott Walker's "budget repair bill", which removed collective bargaining rights from public employees.  However, the recall attempt failed to get enough signatures to be put on the ballot.

Electoral history

References

External links
Senator Mary Lazich at the Wisconsin State Legislature
constituency site
 
28th Senate District, Senator Lazich in the Wisconsin Blue Book (2005–2006)

1952 births
Living people
Wisconsin city council members
County supervisors in Wisconsin
Republican Party members of the Wisconsin State Assembly
University of Wisconsin–Milwaukee alumni
Presidents of the Wisconsin Senate
Republican Party Wisconsin state senators
Women state legislators in Wisconsin
21st-century American politicians
21st-century American women politicians
People from Loyal, Wisconsin
People from New Berlin, Wisconsin
Women city councillors in Wisconsin